General Pedro José Méndez International Airport, also known as Ciudad Victoria International Airport, is an international airport located in Ciudad Victoria, Tamaulipas, Mexico. It handles air traffic of the city of Ciudad Victoria. The airport is operated by Aeropuertos y Servicios Auxiliares, a federal government-owned corporation.

Information
In 2021, the airport handled 15,163 passengers, and in 2022 it handled 15,164 passengers.

The airport has one terminal with one concourse.

Airlines and destinations

Passengers

Cargo

Statistics

Passengers

Gallery

See also 

 List of the busiest airports in Mexico

References

External links
 Ciudad Victoria International Airport

Airports in Tamaulipas
Ciudad Victoria